Vahid Talebloo (born 26 May 1982 in Tehran, Iran) is a retired Iranian football goalkeeper.

Club career

He began receiving media attention when he was able to save Ali Daei's spot kick in an IPL match at the beginning of the 2005/2006 season. Ever since then he has become the main goalkeeper for Esteghlal and was one of the keys to Esteghlal Tehran FC winning the IPL championship in the 05/06 season.

Among a series of good performances was his game against city rivals Persepolis in which he made eight saves including a penalty shot stop and three one-on-one grabs. In August 2006, Talebloo signed a one-year contract extension with Esteghlal F.C. although he had said that he will leave Esteghlal because the directors there had not kept the promises they made to him.

Talebloo extended his contract again with Esteghlal by signing a 2-year contract on 1 March 2007.

In 2007–08 Hazfi Cup, he took Esteghlal to the final himself by stopping penalties in matches against Zob Ahan, Rah Ahan and Foolad. His most memorable stop was against Iranian legend Ali Daei. He was a regular player in 2008–09 for Esteghlal and was one of the key players. He stayed in Esteghlal for another two seasons where he had to compete with Mohammad Mohammadi for a place on the team.

After Esteghlal bought the Team Melli keeper Mehdi Rahmati, he left Esteghlal for Shahin Bushehr in summer 2011 where he played most of the season but missed the last four matches due to the broken shoulder. He left Shahin after the team's relegation to the Azadegan League. After he was out for one season due to serious injury, he returns to the fields by signing a three-year contract with Rah Ahan.

Club career statistics
Last Update  4 June 2015 

1 Statistics Incomplete.

International career

He made his debut for Iran in the Asian Cup 2007 qualifying match against Chinese Taipei in February 2006. In August 2006, Talebloo appeared against UAE and also against Syria in Amir Ghalenoei's first official games as the new Team Melli manager.

In July 2007, he joined the Iranian squad for the 2007 Asian Cup and appeared in Iran's last game against Korea Republic.
Finally he got the chance to prove himself and played in West Asian Football Federation Championship 2008 and won the competition with Team Melli.

Honours

Club
Iran's Premier Football League
Winner: 2
2005–06 with Esteghlal
2008–09 with Esteghlal
Runner up:2
2003–04 with Esteghlal
2010–11 with Esteghlal
Hazfi Cup
Winner: 1
2007–08 with Esteghlal
Runner up: 2
2003–04 with Esteghlal
2011–12 with Shahin Bushehr
2015–16 with Esteghlal

National
Islamic Solidarity Games:
Bronze medal: 1
2005
West Asian Football Federation Championship:
Gold medal: 1
2008

Individual
Football Iran News & Events
Goalkeeper of the year (2006–07)

References

External links
Vahid Talebloo at PersianLeague.com
Vahid Talebloo at TeamMelli.com

1982 births
Living people
People from Tehran
Iranian footballers
Association football goalkeepers
2006 FIFA World Cup players
2007 AFC Asian Cup players
Persian Gulf Pro League players
Esteghlal F.C. players
Shahin Bushehr F.C. players
Rah Ahan players
Iran international footballers